Paul Burke may refer to:

 Paul Burke (actor) (1926–2009), American actor in TV series Naked City (1960–63) and 12 O'Clock High
 Paul Burke (boxer) (born 1966), English professional lightweight and light welterweight boxer
 Paul Burke (rugby union, born 1973), English born Ireland international
 Paul Burke (rugby union, born 1982), Scottish rugby union player
 Paul "Bud" Burke (1934–2017), Kansas state legislator